Cape Possession is a cape which forms the west extremity of Chanticleer Island, just west of Hoseason Island in the Palmer Archipelago. The name was applied by Captain Henry Foster of the Chanticleer, whose party made a landing in this vicinity on January 7, 1829.

Headlands of the Palmer Archipelago